Grid Corporation of Odisha or GRIDCO was incorporated as a Public Sector Undertaking of Government of Odisha on 20 April 1995 under the Companies Act 1956. Grid Corporation of Odisha (GRIDCO) got the Certificate of Commencement of Business on 6 July 1995 and started functioning as a subsidiary of Odisha Electricity Regulatory Commission, a Government of Odisha Power Utility. Grid Corporation of Odisha (GRIDCO) does business of transmission and bulk supply of electricity and other related activities under an exclusive license issued by Odisha Electricity Regulatory Commission.

References

External links
 Official Website of Grid Corporation of Odisha

Energy in Odisha
State agencies of Odisha
State electricity agencies of India
1995 establishments in Orissa
Electric-generation companies of India
Indian companies established in 1995